The Ambassador of Malaysia to the Holy See is the head of Malaysia's diplomatic mission to the Holy See. The position has the rank and status of an Ambassador Extraordinary and Plenipotentiary and is based in the Embassy of Malaysia, Holy See.

List of heads of mission

Ambassadors to the Holy See

See also
 Holy See–Malaysia relations

References 

 
Holy See
Malaysia